Sanjeev Ramesh Kulkarni (born September 21, 1963 in Mumbai, India) is an Indian-born American academic. He is Professor of Electrical Engineering and Dean of the Faculty at Princeton University, where he teaches and conducts research in a broad range of areas including statistical inference, pattern recognition, machine learning, information theory, and signal/image processing.  He is also affiliated with the Department of Operations Research and Financial Engineering and the Department of Philosophy.  His work in philosophy is joint with Gilbert Harman.  Kulkarni served as Associate Dean for Princeton University School of Engineering and Applied Science from 2003–2005, Master of Butler College from 2004-2012, Director of the Keller Center for Innovation in Engineering Education from 2011-2014, and Dean of the Graduate School at Princeton University from 2014-2017.

Kulkarni received degrees in mathematics and electrical engineering from Clarkson University, an M.S. in Electrical Engineering from Stanford University in 1985, and the Ph.D. degree in Electrical Engineering from Massachusetts Institute of Technology in 1991.

References

External links 
 Sanjeev Kulkarni at Princeton Electrical Engineering page
 Sanjeev Kulkarni’s homepage
 Sanjeev Kulkarni at the Mathematics Genealogy Project

Living people
Indian emigrants to the United States
Princeton University faculty
Clarkson University alumni
Stanford University alumni
MIT School of Engineering alumni
1963 births